Operation Crimson was a British-led naval operation in World War II, the objective being simultaneous naval bombardment and aerial strikes on Japanese airfields in the Indonesian cities of Sabang, Lhoknga and Kutaraja, to be launched from aircraft carriers in the Indian Ocean on 25 July 1944.

Plan 

Unlike some earlier operations which had used small forces for harassment and diversion of the Japanese, Operation Crimson was "a full-blooded operation" designed to "make a mess of the air base and harbour installations and wreck any vessels found sheltering there."

Attack 
The aircraft carriers launched 34–39 Vought F4U Corsair fighters, under Lieutenant Commander Frederick Richard Arnold Turnbull. In spite of a five minute delay, it was too dark for the planes to accurately strafe the air fields, so instead they attacked large buildings within the vicinity.  Japanese anti-air defences shot down a single Corsair, but the pilot was rescued.

The battleships, aided by aircraft from Illustrious, bombarded Sabang harbour installations and the local barracks from afar. The cruisers and destroyers spotted their own targets; the former attacked a wireless station and responding shore batteries, while the latter focused on a radar station. Following the main bombardment, Tromp, Quality, Quickmatch, and Quilliam under Captain Richard Onslow entered the Sabang harbour, shelling Japanese positions and launching torpedoes. Return fire from coastal artillery lightly damaged all of the ships but the Quickmatch, causing some casualties and killing a war correspondent.

As the task force withdrew, two Japanese reconnaissance aircraft tried to shadow it, but both were intercepted and shot down. Later in the afternoon, 9–10 Japanese A6M "Zero" fighters approached the force. They were engaged by 13 British Corsairs, which destroyed two Zeros and damaged two more.

Aftermath 
The Allies lost a total of two Corsairs during the operation. A report of the raid states:

British pilots reported that the Japanese airmen were not as skilled as they had been in 1942. Operation Crimson was the final event of Admiral Somerville's military command before concerns about his health forced his transfer to diplomatic duty. The British task force did not launch another strike until Operation Banquet commenced in August.

References

Works cited

External links
 Table of actions by Royal Navy

World War II operations and battles of the Southeast Asia Theatre
Naval aviation operations and battles
World War II aerial operations and battles of the Pacific theatre
Naval battles of World War II involving the Netherlands
Naval battles of World War II involving France
Aerial operations and battles of World War II involving the United Kingdom
Naval battles and operations of World War II involving the United Kingdom
July 1944 events